Bhupathi, Bhupati, Bhoopathi or Boopathi is a name and also surname native to India. 

The name is a combination of two Sanskrit words Bhu (Goddess of Earth, an incarnation of Lakshmi) and Pathi (husband), which literally means "Husband of Bhu" i. e., Lord Vishnu. These words can also be described as Bhu (land) and Pathi (lord), which literally means Lord of the land.

It may also refer to:

People 
 Mahesh Bhupathi (b. 1974), a retired Indian professional tennis player

Movies 
 Bhoopathi (1997 film), a Malayalam language film directed by Joshi, starring Suresh Gopi and Kanaka
 Bhoopathi (2007 film), a Kannada language film directed by S. Govinda, starring Darshan and Sherlin

Other usages
 Nasikabatrachus bhupathi, a frog species found in the Western Ghats in India
 Bhupatinagar, a village, in Purba Medinipur district in West Bengal, India

Disambiguation pages